Yulia Aleksandrovna Lozhechko (born December 14, 1989) is a Russian artistic gymnast. She is the 2007 European champion on the balance beam.

Personal life 
Lozhechko was born on December 14, 1989, in Bryansk, Russia. She is the only child of Olga and Aleksandr. She collects angel figurines and loves cats.

Career 
Lozhechko began gymnastics at age 7, coached by her mother Olga. After her talent was noted, she was sent to train at Round Lake as part of the Russian national team.

Lozhechko competed at the 2004 Junior European Championships where she won a gold medal as part of the Russian Team. She also won a silver medal on the balance beam and a bronze medal in the All Around final. She also qualified to the floor and uneven bars finals.

In 2005, Lozhechko became age-eligible for senior competition. She won a bronze medal in the All Around at the 2005 European Championships behind Marina Debauve of France and fellow Russian Anna Pavlova. At the World Championships later that year, she qualified to the balance beam final but failed to medal after a fall left her in 7th position. At the 2006 European Championships, she was part of the Russian team which won the bronze medal. Although she did not win an individual medal, she did qualify to two event finals - uneven bars and balance beam. She was selected to compete at the 2006 World Championships, but broke fingers in training and had to withdraw.

The highlight so far of Lozhechko's career came at the 2007 European Championships where she won the Gold Medal on the balance beam with a score of 15.675. She also placed 4th in the vault final. Lozhechko was selected for the Russian Team for the 2007 World Championships. The Russian team was set to medal until an error from Ekaterina Kramarenko which nullified her vault left the Russians in 8th. Despite this, the team qualified for the 2008 Summer Olympics where Lozhechko was included in the squad but did not compete.

Lozhechko and teammate Maxim Devyatovski were banned from the national training center in Round Lake after the 2007 Worlds. During the preliminary competition, she changed her balance beam routine in order to qualify for the event final but fell. She was allowed to return in December 2007 but she and the head coach Kiryashov are still feuding. Kiryashov blamed Lozhechko's poor performance on "psychological problems. I know exactly what they are, but I don't want to talk about it. When she listened to us, the coaches, everything was fine, but as soon as she tries to do everything on her own and to her own taste she has immediate problems. We know that Lozhechko is going through hard times. But we are trying to help, and I hope soon everything will be fine again."

Lozhechko's favourite apparatus is floor and she admires Alexei Nemov, Aleksei Bondarenko and Svetlana Khorkina.

Competitive history

External links

Russian female artistic gymnasts
1989 births
Living people
Sportspeople from Bryansk
European champions in gymnastics
Universiade medalists in gymnastics
Universiade bronze medalists for Russia
Medalists at the 2011 Summer Universiade
21st-century Russian women